Perdita scutellaris is a bee species  from California in the United States. It is only found in sand dune habitats or other sandy areas. It is oligolectic, collecting pollen only from plants in the genus Tiquilia.

References 

Andrenidae
Insects described in 1962